The 2022 Granite State Derby  was a NASCAR Whelen Modified Tour race that was held on May 21, 2022. It was contested over 175 laps on the  oval. It was 4th race of the 2022 NASCAR Whelen Modified Tour season. After winning in his first start of the season, Doug Coby collected the victory, going 2-for-2 on the season.

Report

Entry list 

 (R) denotes rookie driver.
 (i) denotes driver who is ineligible for series driver points.

Practice

Qualifying

Qualifying results

Race 

Laps: 181

Race statistics 

 Lead changes:  3
 Cautions/Laps: 5 cautions for 24 laps
 Time of race: 0:57:10
 Average speed: 70.289 mph

References 

2022 NASCAR Whelen Modified Tour
2022 in sports in New Hampshire
Granite State Derby